Muxas (also, Mukhas) is a village and municipality in the Oghuz Rayon of Azerbaijan.  It has a population of 1,058.

References 

Populated places in Oghuz District